Vaali may refer to:
 Vaali, Estonia, a village in Järva County, Estonia
 Vali (Ramayana), a character from the Ramayana
 Vaali (poet) (1931-2015), Indian Tamil-language poet and lyricist
 Vaalee (1999 film), a 1999 Indian Tamil film starring Ajith Kumar
 Vaalee (2001 film), a 2001 Indian Kannada film starring Sudeep